Catalino Luis Roy Ortiz served as the Paraguayan Minister of National Defense under President Fernando Lugo since June 2011.

References

Living people
Defence ministers of Paraguay
Year of birth missing (living people)